Skaudvilė (Samogitian: Skaudvėlė) is a city in the Tauragė district municipality of Lithuania.

History
During the Second World War, in August 1941, the Jewish community of the town was massacred in a mass execution perpetrated by an einsatzgruppen. 300 Jews were killed.

Gallery

References

Cities in Lithuania
Cities in Tauragė County
Rossiyensky Uyezd
Holocaust locations in Lithuania